The West Block is a Canadian news and political affairs television series that debuted on November 6, 2011 on the Global Television Network. The name of the program is taken from the West Block of Parliament Hill.

The series follows a Sunday morning talk show format. The series was hosted by Tom Clark from 2011 until his retirement from journalism in 2016, and then by Vassy Kapelos in 2017 and 2018 until she left the network to become host of CBC News Network's Power & Politics. On June 25, 2018 Mercedes Stephenson, previously the host of Power Play on CTV News Channel, was named Global's Ottawa bureau chief and host of The West Block.

Global Sunday, a previous Sunday public affairs show from Global, aired from 2001 to 2005.

References

External links
 

2010s Canadian television news shows
Global Television Network original programming
2011 Canadian television series debuts
Television shows filmed in Ottawa
2010s Canadian television talk shows
2020s Canadian television talk shows
Television series by Corus Entertainment
Canadian Sunday morning talk shows
2020s Canadian television news shows